Poporo is a device used by indigenous cultures in present and pre-Columbian South America for storage of small amounts of lime produced from burnt and crushed sea-shells. It consists of two pieces:  the receptacle, and the lid which includes a pin that is used to carry the lime to the mouth while chewing coca leaves.  Since the chewing of coca is sacred for the indigenous people, the poporos are also attributed with mystical powers and social status.

In Colombia, poporos are found in archaeological remains from the Chibcha, Muisca, and Quimbaya cultures among others. The materials used in the early periods are mainly pottery and carved stone.  In classic periods gold and tumbaga are the most frequent: an example of this is the Poporo Quimbaya exhibited in the Gold Museum which is a national symbol.  At the present time, the indigenous people of Sierra Nevada de Santa Marta still use poporos made with the dried fruits of a plant of genus cucurbita (totumo), in the traditional way.

Poporo Quimbaya
One particularly famous poporo, the Poporo Quimbaya, is a pre-Columbian artpiece of the classic quimbaya period, currently exhibited in the Gold Museum in Bogotá, Colombia. Its primary use was as a ceremonial device for chewing of coca leaves during religious ceremonies.  It was made around 300 CE with a lost-wax casting process.

It is believed that the artpiece was stolen from a burial chamber in the early 1930s, on Loma del Pajarito ("Birdie Hill") near Anori in the Antioquia department, where, at the time, the grave robbing of indigenous tombs was very common, often ending with destruction of important archeological pieces in order to extract the gold.

In 1939 the Banco de la República, the central bank of Colombia, purchased the Poporo Quimbaya, in an effort to preserve it from destruction. This began a larger project of preservation of pre-Columbian goldwork that led to the creation of the Gold Museum in Bogotá.

The Poporo Quimbaya is an unusual piece, made of tumbaga, with oddly minimalistic lines, that give it a modern look. It is one of the most recognized pre-Columbian artpieces, being often used as a symbol of the indigenous pre-Columbian culture.  It has been depicted in the Colombian currency, in coins and bills. A reproduction served as the winner's trophy for the 2019 and 2020 editions of the Tour Colombia cycling race.

A poporo made of copper alloy with details

Notes

External links

The Art of Precolumbian Gold: The Jan Mitchell Collection, an exhibition catalog from The Metropolitan Museum of Art (fully available online as PDF), which contains material on poporo
"The use of the poporo," Tairona Heritage Trust

History of Colombia
Colombian culture
Archaeological artifacts
National symbols of Colombia
Indigenous sculpture of the Americas
Coca